The 1871 Stalybridge by-election was fought on 1 March 1871.  The byelection was fought due to the Death of the incumbent MP of the Conservative Party, James Sidebottom.  It was won by the Liberal candidate Nathaniel Buckley.

References

1871 elections in the United Kingdom
1871 in England
19th century in Cheshire
By-elections to the Parliament of the United Kingdom in Lancashire constituencies
By-elections to the Parliament of the United Kingdom in Cheshire constituencies
Stalybridge